The Ascocorticiaceae are a family of fungi in the Ascomycota, class Leotiomycetes. This is a monotypic taxon, containing the single genus Ascocorticium. The family was first described by Joseph Schröter in 1893. Species in this family have a widespread distribution in temperate locales, where they grow saprobically, often on the bark of conifers.

References

Helotiales
Ascomycota families
Taxa named by Joseph Schröter
Taxa described in 1893